Duane Denison (born January 21, 1959) is an American guitarist best known for work with the avant-garde rock band The Jesus Lizard. He is also a founding member of super-group Tomahawk.

Biography
Denison began his musical career by studying classical guitar at Eastern Michigan University. His work with classical guitar helped influence his unique sound, which helped earn him a spot on Spin Magazine's  "100 Greatest Guitarists of All Time." "Denison has played warped jazz-rock with Firewater, cool jazz with the Denison-Kimball Trio, experimental alt-metal with Tomahawk, rockabilly punk with Th’ Legendary Shack Shakers, and outlaw country with Hank Williams III. But the angular, metallic sheets of noise that Denison unleashed with the Jesus Lizard are what he’ll ultimately be remembered and revered for. Tightly controlled yet capable of ripping and tearing like a runaway chainsaw, Denison’s riffs influenced an entire generation of post-hardcore guitarists, including the burgeoning wave of noise-punkers like the Men and Roomrunner.” 

In 1999 Denison moved to Nashville after The Jesus Lizard broke up in order to play with Hank Williams III's "Damn Band.  Soon after his move to Nashville Denison began collaborating and exchanging demo tapes with Mike Patton, whom he met at a Mr. Bungle show in 1999.  Denison started the demos on a 4 track tape machine and sent them to Patton who added vocals to the tapes and sent them back.  After having a solid idea of what the songs should sound like they went into the studio and recorded what would become the first Tomahawk album which was released in 2001.

Denison and ex-Ministry bassist Paul Barker collaborated in 2007 to form a new band, U.S.S.A. U.S.S.A. released one album in that same year, titled The Spoils.

From late 2008 until 2012, he played guitar for Nashville-based Legendary Shack Shakers. Denison supplied the lead guitars on EmptyMansions snakes/vultures/sulfate released on April 2, 2013.

Discography

References

 

Living people
American rock guitarists
American male guitarists
Firewater (band) members
Post-hardcore musicians
Noise rock musicians
Pigface members
1959 births
Tomahawk (band) members
The Jesus Lizard members
20th-century American guitarists
Silver Jews members
Legendary Shack Shakers members
Assjack members
20th-century American male musicians
The Denison/Kimball Trio members